Fatima Island is a small island on Cooks River in Tempe, New South Wales, Australia. A low-lying sandbar, it is a refuge for Australian pelicans, egrets and silver gulls. It was named in 1951 for a Portuguese statue of Our Lady of Fátima.

The island is slowly being washed away, something that is of concern to local environmentalists.

References

Islands of New South Wales
Cooks River